NPAP is an acronym which may refer to:

National Psychological Association for Psychoanalysis
Network Printing Alliance Protocol; see Printer Working Group
National Police Accountability Project; see People's Law Office
N-PAP, a variant of the Zastava PAP series of sporting rifles.